The neocortex may refer to:
 Neocortex, a part of the mammalian brain
 Doctor Neo Cortex, a video game character from the Crash Bandicoot series
 Neo Cortex, a trance music act best known for their song, Elements